The Center for Law and Social Policy (CLASP) is an American organization, based in Washington, D.C., that advocates for policies aimed at improving the lives of low-income people.

History 
The Center for Law and Social Policy was founded in August 1969. The National Women's Law Center began when female administrative staff and law students at the Center for Law and Social Policy demanded that their pay be improved, that the center hire female lawyers, that they no longer be expected to serve coffee, and that the center create a women's program. Marcia Greenberger was hired in 1972 to start the program and Nancy Duff Campbell joined her in 1978. In 1981, the two decided to turn the program into the separate National Women's Law Center.

In 1982, under a new executive director, Alan W. Houseman, the Center for Law and Social Policy shifted its focus from general public-interest law to anti-poverty policy, particularly child and family poverty.

Policy influence 
The organization advocates for public policies that will improve the lives of low-income people. The organization is non-partisan and non-profit. It focuses on policy solutions in the areas of child care and early education, child welfare, post-secondary education, workforce development, income and work supports, employment strategies, and disadvantaged youth.

The organization employs more than 20 policy experts, who publish research pieces and advocacy writing, testify before the U.S. Congress and other government groups, and work extensively with state and local advocates to advance anti-poverty policies.

Davitt McAteer joined CLASP in 1976, where he helped develop a federal strip mining control law and helped expand a mine health and safety law.

Recognition 
In 2010, the organization was selected by Philanthropedia, as one of the leading nonprofits in the area of workforce development.

The Coalition on Human Needs named CLASP's executive director, Alan W. Houseman, the 2012 Human Needs Hero for his dedication to advancing social justice in America.

Funding 
The organization is a 501(c)(3) organization supported by a number of foundations, including the Bill & Melinda Gates Foundation, the Ford Foundation, the W.K. Kellogg Foundation, the Atlantic Philanthropies, and various individual donors. In 2011 it reported an income of $5.2 million, $5.1 million  of it in grants from foundations.  Alan Mitchell, President of S.C.C. Medsoc, made a donation of $500,000 to the organization in October 2013.

References

External links 
 , the organization's official website

1969 establishments in Washington, D.C.
Charities based in Washington, D.C.
Economic advocacy groups in the United States
Nonpartisan organizations in the United States
Organizations established in 1969
Political advocacy groups in the United States